Nicole Nagel is a German-American model, actress, photographer and writer.

Early life
Nagel was born in Berlin, Germany and discovered as a teenager by German photographer Werner Bokelberg. She began modeling and working around the world and was on the cover of more than 40 magazines in Germany and Italy, becoming one of Germany's first supermodels. In 1989 Nagel appeared in the Pirelli Calendar photographed by Joyce Tennyson.

Career
Nagel was represented by numerous modeling agencies from 1980–1989, including Parker-Sed, Ford Models and Click Model Management.  She appeared on magazine covers in Germany and Italy and in fashion magazines including Vogue, Harper's Bazaar, Elle, Madamoiselle and Brides and worked with photographers including Bruce Weber, Patrick Demarchelier and Joyce Tennyson.  Nagel appeared in campaigns for fashion brands including Calvin Klein [lensed by Bruce Weber], Pringle of Scotland and Triumph International as well as in advertisements for retailers including Macy's, Bloomingdales and Karstadt.

In 1992, Nagel moved to Los Angeles and started acting in American and German productions. She also appeared in commercials and music videos. She is most well known for her role in Alan Smithee's Burn Hollywood Burn and for her recurring roles as Hulda as Doug Ross' (George Clooney) love interest on the NBC television series ER and as Kate, Jack Richmond's (Judd Nelson) love interest on Suddenly Susan.  She also appeared on the television series Married With Children and with Lorenzo Lamas in Air America in 1998.

Nagel continues to act in television and movies, recently in the German miniseries Schuld und Unschuld, alongside Heinz Hoenig and Letztes Kapitel alongside Simon Verhoeven.

Nagel's work as a photographer and writer has been published in global publications including Dein Spiegel and Art Investor.

Personal life
In 1996 Nagel married Pierre Caland, a French-Lebanese businessman. They have a daughter, Olympia Nagel-Caland, born in 1999.

Filmography

References

 Der Krieg der Traume - Hollywood Focus Magazine Nr. 31, 1997

External links 
 
 The Model Archive of Marlowe Press
 Music Video "EYES UP"
 Video Making of Pirelli Calendar the 80#s Nicole ( Nickname Nicky Nagel )  at 1989 Calendar shot by Joyce Tennyso n

Year of birth missing (living people)
Living people
Actresses from Berlin
German female models
German emigrants to the United States
Photographers from Berlin
Models from Berlin